The Martyrdom of Saint Justina is a c.1570–1575 oil-on-canvas painting by Paolo Veronese with assistance from his younger brother, originally produced for Santa Giustina Basilica in Padua and now in the Uffizi in Florence. It shows the martyrdom of Justina of Padua.

A painting on this subject – probably this work – is recorded in the Canonici collection in Ferrara in 1632. From there it passed into the collection of Paolo del Sera, agent and intermediary in Venice for cardinal Leopoldo de' Medici. The cardinal himself acquired it and Veronese's Annunciation from del Sera in 1654 and brought them both to Florence. Martyrdom was restored in 1988.

References

Paintings in the collection of the Uffizi
Paintings of saints
Paintings by Paolo Veronese
1575 paintings